Horacio Moráles (27 June 1943 – 26 February 2021) was an Argentine footballer who played as a defender. He competed in the men's tournament at the 1964 Summer Olympics.

References

External links
 

1943 births
2021 deaths
Unión de Santa Fe footballers
Argentine footballers
Association football defenders
Argentina international footballers
Olympic footballers of Argentina
Footballers at the 1964 Summer Olympics
Footballers from Buenos Aires